The Painted Rock Mountains are a short  long mountain range of the north-central Sonoran Desert southwest of Phoenix, Arizona and in southwest Maricopa County. The Gila River flows through the central-north end of the range.

The famous Painted Rock Petroglyph Site lies at the northeast end of the range, adjacent the Painted Rock Reservoir, and the reservoir lies at the eastern end of the agricultural river valley that is locally named as the Lower Gila River Valley, extending approximately from the Colorado River at Yuma to the west and the reservoir at the east. The Gila River crosses all of southern Arizona from southwest New Mexico, and is the drainage for about 1/2 of Arizona (the south).

Peaks, and landforms
(The range has many northwest-by-southeast ridgelines.)

See also
 List of mountain ranges of Maricopa County, Arizona

References

External links

 Painted Rocks Mountains, Peakbagger.com (coordinates)

Gila River
Mountain ranges of the Sonoran Desert
Mountain ranges of Maricopa County, Arizona
Mountain ranges of Arizona